The 412 BC epidemic of an unknown disease, often identified as influenza, was reported in Northern Greece by Hippocrates and in Rome by Livy. Both described the epidemic continuing for roughly a year.

The disease outbreak caused a food shortage in the Roman Republic, and a famine was only prevented with food relief from Sicily and Etruria, and via trade missions to the "peoples round about who dwelt on the Tuscan sea or by the Tiber."

Symptoms 
Hippocrates named a wide variety of symptoms, among them: fever, coughing, pain in head and neck, and emaciation. The disease proved fatal most often among prepubescent children.

References 

412 BC
Ancient health disasters
Epidemics
History of ancient medicine
Influenza outbreaks
5th century BC in the Roman Republic
5th century BC in Greece